The Morocco women's national under-20 football team represents Morocco in international youth women's football competitions.

The team won the bronze medal in the women's tournament at the 2019 African Games held in Rabat, Morocco.

History

Players

Current squad
The following players were named for the xxxx  on xxxx.

Competitive record

 Champions   Runners-up   Third place   Fourth place  

Red border color indicates tournament was held on home soil.

FIFA U-20 Women's World Cup

African U-20 Women's World Cup qualification record

UNAF U-20 Women's Tournament record

See also 
 Morocco women's national football team
 Morocco women's national under-17 football team

References 

under-20
African women's national under-20 association football teams
Arabic women's national under-20 association football teams